Cengizhan Kartaltepe (born June 24, 1973 in Bandırma, Balıkesir) is a Turkish volleyball player. He is 193 cm and plays as libero. He has been playing for Fenerbahçe SK since 2009 and wears the number 1. He played 151 times for the national team and also played for Erdemir, Arçelik, Halkbankası and Mef Okulları.

He signed a contract in June 2009. He married with Turkey national women's basketball team player Nilay Yiğit in 2010.

Honours and awards
 5 times Turkish Men's Volleyball League Champion
 8 times Turkish Cup runner-up
 1 time Turkish Cup Champion
 2 times CEV Champions League Final 4
 2009-10 Balkan Cup Champion with Fenerbahçe SK

External links
 Player profile at fenerbahce.org

References

1973 births
Living people
People from Bandırma
Turkish men's volleyball players
Fenerbahçe volleyballers